Siyabonga Booi (born 29 July 1986) is a South African cricketer. He was included in the South Western Districts cricket team squad for the 2016 Africa T20 Cup.

References

External links
 

1986 births
Living people
South African cricketers
Border cricketers
South Western Districts cricketers
Place of birth missing (living people)